Oberea rotundipennis is a species of beetle in the family Cerambycidae. It was described by Stephan von Breuning in 1956.

References

Beetles described in 1956
rotundipennis